Hoogvliet is an above-ground subway station of the Rotterdam Metro lines C and D. The station is located in the borough Hoogvliet in Rotterdam and features two side platforms.

The station was opened on 25 October 1974. On that date, the North-South Line (currently operated by line D trains) was extended from its former terminus, Slinge, towards Zalmplaat station. Since the East-West Line was connected to the North-South Line in November 2002, trains of what is currently line C also call at Hoogvliet station.

Rotterdam Metro stations
Railway stations opened in 1974
1974 establishments in the Netherlands
Railway stations in the Netherlands opened in the 20th century